Kevin March may refer to:

 Kevin March (businessman), American business executive
 Kevin March (musician), American drummer, record producer and songwriter